Troya may refer to:

 Troya (Asia Minor), the Turkish and Spanish translation for the city of Troy
 Carlo Troya (1784–1858), Italian historian and politician
 C.D. Troya, a Honduran football club

See also 
 
 Troja (disambiguation)
 Troy (disambiguation)
 Troyan (disambiguation)